Yamjal may refer to

 Devar Yamjal in Ranga Reddy District
 Turkayamjal in Ranga Reddy District